The AGS JH25B was a Formula One car designed by Michel Costa for use in the 1991 Formula one season by the French Automobiles Gonfaronnaises Sportives team. It was powered by the 3.5L Ford DFR V8. The car was driven by Italian drivers Gabriele Tarquini, Fabrizio Barbazza and Swedish driver Stefan Johansson.

The AGS JH25B's best result was 8th place by Tarquini at the United States Grand Prix. The car was unable to qualify for many of the 1991 races, and on the rare occasion it qualified, was retired from the race.

Automobiles Gonfaronnaises Sportives was experiencing financial problems, and the team was not able to upgrade the car further, the car got slower and spare parts were used up. The team was sold to Italian businessmen Patrizio Cantu and Gabriele Raffanelli, and from the Italian Grand Prix, the JH25B was replaced by the JH27, which was considered worse than the JH25B, and three races later, AGS closed down.

Complete Formula One results

References

AGS Formula One cars
1991 Formula One season cars